Edmund Albert Chester Sr. (June 22, 1897 – October 14, 1973) was an American television executive. He served as a Vice President and executive at the CBS radio and television networks during the 1940s. As Director of Latin American Relations he collaborated with the Department of State to develop CBS's "La Cadena de Las Americas" radio network in support of Pan-Americanism during World War II. He also served as a highly respected journalist and Bureau Chief for Latin America at Associated Press and Vice President at La Prensa Asociada in the 1930s.He was awarded the Carlos Manuel de Cespedes National Order of Merit by the government of Cuba in recognition of his efforts to foster greater understanding between the peoples of Cuba and the United States of America.

Biography
During the course of a journalistic career which ranged over two decades, he assumed a central role in the development of a viable international radio transmission network linking the United States of America with the developing nations of South America and Central America for the CBS network from 1940 through 1949. As Director of Short Wave Broadcasts for CBS he supervised the creation of this vast shortwave service which was widely known throughout South America as the Network of the Americas (La Cadena de las Americas).

Associated Press
Prior to accepting  William S. Paley's invitation to join the CBS network, Edmund Chester served as a journalist in Latin America for the Associated Press for twenty years. He first joined the Associated Press in 1930 in Louisville, Kentucky after leaving his position at the Louisville Courier-Journal. During this time he reported on several historic events including: the Lima Pan American Conference in 1938,  the catastrophic earthquake in Chile during 1939 and the Havana Pan American Conference in 1940. In later years he emerged as the Executive Director for Associated Press' Latin America Department and Vice President of Associated Press' Latin American subsidiary La Presnes Asociada.

CBS network
After joining CBS in 1940, Chester assumed the post of Vice President of the Columbia Broadcasting System and assisted William S. Paley and high level diplomats from South America in the development of the intricate broadcast standards which would serve as the foundations for this vital information link during the turbulent World War II era. He also collaborated with his counterparts in Europe during the post World War II era in order to coordinate the creation of new technical broadcast standards and the expansion of the broadcast network which linked the two continents.

His endeavors were not limited to the technical development of CBS' worldwide broadcasting capabilities. As CBS' Director of Latin American Relations Mr. Chester worked in concert with the Department of State, the United States Office of the Coordinator of Inter-American Affairs (OCIAA) and Voice of America while supervising the development of news and cultural programming for live broadcasts to North America and Latin America from the CBS broadcast studios in New York City. These imaginative cultural initiatives served to foster benevolent diplomatic relations and high level cultural exchanges throughout South America as part of President Franklin Roosevelt's support for Pan-Americanism and cultural diplomacy during the 1940s. Popular programs such as Viva America showcased professional musical talent of the highest caliber in live concert while preserving cultural authenticity
and were supervised by the Department of State and the Office of Inter-American Affairs during the tenure of Nelson Rockefeller. 

Chester presented prominent musicians from both North America and South America for extended appearances on these broadcasts. Included among these performing artists were Alfredo Antonini (American (orchestral conductor); Juan Arvizu (Mexican "Tenor with the Silken Voice"); Nestor Mesta Chaires (Mexican tenor aka "El Gitano De Mexico"); Eva Garza (Mexican songstress); Terig Tucci (Argentine composer/arranger); John Serry, Sr. (American concert accordionist/composer), Elsa Miranda (Puerto Rican vocalist), the Los Panchos Trio, Manuolita Arriola (1946)   and members of the CBS Pan American Orchestra. By recruiting some of the best entertainment talent from throughout the hemisphere, Chester hoped to present an image of the American people as soulful romantics rather than mere "cogs in the national industrial machine", while also providing accurate and timely news programming.  

As World War II evolved,  the shortwave broadcasts which were transmitted over Chester's "La Cadena de Las Americas" grew in popularity and scope throughout Latin America. Initially broadcasts only lasted for seven hours each day. By 1945, Chester successfully developed the network to broadcast high quality entertainment and news programming over 114 affiliated radio stations in twenty Latin American nations.

In 1945, Chester also emerged as a Producer for the CBS broadcast of "Program of the Three Americas" which showcased the music of such noted American composers as: Irving Berlin, Jerome Kern and Richard Rodgers on the La Cadena de Las Americas network. The broadcast illustrated Chester's collaboration with Alfredo Antonini (Conductor), Wendell Adams (Director) and Harry Kramer (Commentator). 

In later years, Mr. Chester emerged as the Director of News, Special Events and Sports for the CBS Television Network (1948). During this period he assumed a central role in coordinating the integration of the vast CBS radio network with the evolving television division. 

In 1949, Chester also collaborated with one of the original Murrow Boys Larry LeSueur, the media advisor Lyman Bryson and Benjamin V. Cohen (United Nations Assistant Secretary General) in yet another imaginative journalistic endeavor for CBS. In the course of supervising historic live television coverage of the proceedings of the United Nations General Assembly and the United Nations Security Council from Lake Success, New York on the broadcast series "United Nations in Action" in November 1949, Mr. Chester demonstrated an enduring commitment to the lofty professional standards for excellence in broadcasting which served as the hallmark of the entire CBS network for decades to come. The series of broadcasts was honored with the George Foster Peabody Award for Television News in 1949.

As a new decade began, Chester collaborated once again with leading journalists at CBS Radio including: Edward R. Murrow and Eric Sevareid in a discussion of the major news developments of the year on the broadcast "Challenge of the 50's Years of Crisis" in 1951.

Politics
Following his retirement from CBS in 1952, Chester served as a consultant on economic and foreign affairs to his friend Fulgencio Batista in Cuba. Earlier in 1938, he reported on Batista's proclaimed vision for the preservation of democracy in Cuba. Subsequently in 1954, Chester completed a more comprehensive biography which outlined Batista's rise from a sergeant in the army to the leadership of the Cuban government.  Following Fidel Castro's successful rise to power in 1959, Batista's military dictatorship of 1952-1959 collapsed, and Edmund Chester joined the ranks of thousands of other American citizens and companies whose investments on the island were abruptly seized by Cuba's new Ministry of Ill-Gotten Goods.

Death
Edmund Chester died at the age of 75 on October 14, 1973 in Mount Dora, Florida. He was survived by his wife Enna and their four children.

Works
 A Sergeant Named Batista (New York, NY: Henry Holt & Company, 1954)

Awards
In recognition of his efforts to foster better relations between the peoples of Cuba and the United States of America, Chester was awarded the Carlos Manuel de Cespedes National Order of Merit (1943) by the government of Cuba - its highest civilian honor.

Archive
 Edmund Albert Chester's papers, photographs and correspondence relating to Latin American politics and CBS radio broadcasting in Latin America are archived at Online Archive of California.

References

External links
WorldCat.org Library holdings for Edmund A. Chester
GettyImages.com Photographs of Edmund Chester

American television executives
American male journalists
1897 births
1973 deaths
American radio executives
CBS executives
Journalists from New York City